The following is an incomplete list of former grand masters of the Order of Calatrava, the current grand master of the order is King Felipe VI of Spain

 Don García (1164–1169)
 Fernando Icaza (1169–1170)
 Martín Pérez de Siones (1170–1182)
 Nuño Pérez de Quiñones (1182–1199)
 Martín Martínez (1199–1207)
 Ruy Díaz de Yanguas (1207–1212) 
 Rodrigo Garcés (1212–1216)
 Martín Fernández de Quintana (1216–1218)
 Gonzalo Yáñez de Novoa (1218–1238)
 Martín Ruiz de Cevallos (1238–1240)
 Gómez Manrique (1240–1243)
 Fernando Ordóñez (1243–1254)
 Pedro Yáñez (1254–1267)
 Juan González (1267–1284)
 Ruy Pérez Ponce de León (1284–1295)
 Diego López de Santsoles (1295–1296)
 Garci López de Padilla (1296–1322)
 Juan Núñez de Prado (1322–1355) 
 Diego García de Padilla (1355–1365)
 Martín López de Córdoba (1365–1371)
 Pedro Muñiz de Godoy y Sandoval (1371–1384)
 Pedro Álvarez de Pereira (1384–1385)
 Gonzalo Núñez de Guzmán (1385–1404)
 Enrique de Villena (1404–1407)
 Luis González de Guzmán (1407–1443)
 Fernando de Padilla (a few months in 1443)
 Alfonso de Aragón y de Escobar (end of 1443–1445)
 Pedro Girón Acuña Pacheco (1445–1466)
 Rodrigo Téllez Girón (1466–1482)
 García López de Padilla (1482–1487) 
 Catholic Monarchs (from 1487 onwards)
 King Juan Carlos I of Spain
 King Felipe VI of Spain (Incumbent)

References

 :es:Orden de Calatrava

Bibliography 
 

 
Lists of medieval people
History-related lists
Calatrava